This is a list of shipwrecks located in or off the coast of France.

Aquitaine

Brittany

Channel Islands

Corsica

Languedoc-Roussillon

Nord-Pas-de-Calais

Normandy

Pays de la Loire

Poitou-Charentes

Provence-Alpes-Côte d'Azur

References

External links

France
 
France transport-related lists